Juan Sarmiento Soto (13 November 19417 April 2015) was a Peruvian engineer and public administrator who served as  Minister of Housing, Construction and Sanitation under President Alan García from September 2009 to July 2011.

Biography
Juan Sarmiento Soto is a Civil engineer. He was appointed as the Deputy Minister of Housing, Construction, and Sanitation in August 2006, and became full Minister in September 2009, serving through the end of the Second presidency of Alan García in July 2011. Previously, he served in the same ministry as Deputy Minister of Housing and Construction in the entire administration of the First presidency of Alan García.

He is a member of the Peruvian Aprista Party. From 2004 to 2007, he served as Director of Transport and Communications in the National Executive Committee. Additionally, he served as an advisor in the elaboration of the 2006-2011 Government Plan.

References

1941 births
Government ministers of Peru
2015 deaths
People from Lima
American Popular Revolutionary Alliance politicians